Ashutosh (from   meaning "rapid, easy" and   meaning "gratification") is a male given name and one of the names given to Shiva. The word Ashutosh refers to someone who can be easily gratified and someone who fulfils wishes instantly. Ashutosh is one of the thousand names (Sahasra naam) of Mahadeva.

Persons

 Ashutosh (spiritual leader), the founder of the spiritual group Divya Jyoti Jagriti Sansthan

Given name
Ashutosh Deb (1803–1856), musician and Hindu priest in Calcutta, producer of an early Bengali dictionary
Ashutosh Lobo Gajiwala  (born 1993), Indian actor 
Ashutosh Gowariker (born 1965), Indian film director, actor, writer and producer
Ashutosh (politician) (born 1965), Indian journalist and politician
Ashutosh Kaushik, Indian model, actor, reality TV personality
Ashutosh Mukherjee (1864–1924), Bengali educator 
Ashutosh Mukhopadhyay, anglicized spelling of surname: Mukherjee, prominent writer of modern Bengali literature
Ashutosh Phatak, Indian rock artist and composer
Ashutosh Rana, Indian actor
Ashutosh Sabharwal, American engineer

Other uses
Asutosh College, affiliated to the University of Calcutta